Piotr Włodarczyk (born 4 May 1977) is a former Polish footballer who played as a striker. Włodarczyk was known for his skill in getting into good shooting positions. He scored more than 40 goals in four years.

Włodarczyk returned to Legia's first team on 8 March 2006 and put in some strong performances to close the season. In June 2008 he was transferred to Aris FC having the opportunity to participate in the forthcoming UEFA Cup.

Włodarzyk is a former member of the Poland national football team. He has played a total of four games, scoring twice.

International goals

Private life
He is the brother of Polish heptathlete Urszula Włodarczyk and the father of Polish footballer Szymon Włodarczyk.

References

External links
 
 

1977 births
Living people
Polish footballers
Poland international footballers
Legia Warsaw players
AJ Auxerre players
Ruch Chorzów players
Widzew Łódź players
Śląsk Wrocław players
Zagłębie Lubin players
Aris Thessaloniki F.C. players
OFI Crete F.C. players
Bałtyk Gdynia players
Ekstraklasa players
Ligue 1 players
Super League Greece players
Polish expatriate footballers
Expatriate footballers in France
Expatriate footballers in Greece
People from Wałbrzych
Sportspeople from Lower Silesian Voivodeship
Association football forwards